Henry "Hank" Gabriel Blosser (March 16, 1928, Harrisonburg, Virginia – March 20, 2013, East Lansing, Michigan) was an American nuclear physicist, known as a director for designing and building superconducting cyclotrons.

Biography
His father, Emanuel Blosser (1877–1953), was a prominent citizen of Harrisonburg, Virginia, and was extremely successful in the poultry business and in banking. After graduating from Harrisonburg High School in 1945, Henry Blosser attended the University of Virginia (UVA) for a year and then served for two years in the U.S. Navy. At UVA he was an undergraduate from 1948 to 1951, when he graduated with a bachelor's degree in mathematics. From 1951 to 1954 he was a graduate student in physics at UVA, graduating with an M.S. in 1952 and a Ph.D. in 1954. His Ph.D. thesis Large-angle scattering of electrons at 65 kilovolts was supervised by Frank L. Hereford Jr.

From 1954 to 1958 in Oak Ridge National Laboratory's Cyclotron Nuclear Research Group, Blosser was a physicist and group leader. At Michigan State University (MSU), he was an associate professor from 1958 to 1961, a full professor from 1961 to 1990, and a university distinguished professor from 1990 until he retired in 2003. At MSU's cyclotron laboratory he was the director 1958 to 1985 and co-director from 1985 to 1988, when he resigned as co-director. From 1984 until his death in 2013 he was also an adjunct professor in Wayne State University's department of radiation oncology.

After formally retiring from MSU in 2013, he developed cyclotrons for cancer therapy.

In 1968 Blosser was elected a Fellow of the American Physical Society. He was a Guggenheim Fellow for the academic year 1973–1974. In 1984 he was one of ten people designated as "Michiganian of the Year" by The Detroit News.

In 1992 he received, jointly with Robert E. Pollock, the American Physical Society's Tom W. Bonner Prize in Nuclear Physics for pioneering development of innovations in particle accelerators. Blosser's work was cited as follows:

Upon his death in 2013 he was survived by his widow, 4 children, 14 grandchildren, and 2 great-grandchildren.

Selected publications

References

1926 births
2013 deaths
20th-century American physicists
21st-century American physicists
Accelerator physicists
American nuclear physicists
University of Virginia alumni
Michigan State University faculty
Fellows of the American Physical Society
People from Harrisonburg, Virginia
Oak Ridge National Laboratory people